Clayton Township is one of the fourteen townships of Perry County, Ohio, United States.  The 2000 census found 1,432 people in the township.

Geography
Located in the north central part of the county, it borders the following townships:
Madison Township - north
Newton Township, Muskingum County - northeast
Harrison Township - east
Pike Township - south
Jackson Township - southwest corner
Reading Township - west
Hopewell Township - northwest corner

No municipalities are located in Clayton Township, although the unincorporated community of Rehoboth lies in the township's south.

Name and history
It is the only Clayton Township statewide.

Government
The township is governed by a three-member board of trustees, who are elected in November of odd-numbered years to a four-year term beginning on the following January 1. Two are elected in the year after the presidential election and one is elected in the year before it. There is also an elected township fiscal officer, who serves a four-year term beginning on April 1 of the year after the election, which is held in November of the year before the presidential election. Vacancies in the fiscal officership or on the board of trustees are filled by the remaining trustees.

References

External links
County website

Townships in Perry County, Ohio
Townships in Ohio